Psi¹ Draconis (ψ¹ Draconis, abbreviated Psi¹ Dra, ψ¹ Dra), also designated 31 Draconis, is a triple star system in the northern constellation of Draco. The system is fairly close, and is located about 75 light-years (23 parsecs) from the Sun, based on its parallax.

Psi¹ Draconis was considered a binary star consisting of an F-type subgiant and an F-type main-sequence star, designated Psi¹ Draconis A (officially named Dziban , from the traditional name of the system) and Psi¹ Draconis B, respectively. In 2015, Psi¹ Draconis A was itself found to be a double-lined spectroscopic binary, making the system a triple. The companion to Psi¹ Draconis A was designated Psi¹ Draconis C by its discoverers.

Also in 2015, Psi¹ Draconis B was discovered to be orbited by an exoplanet, designated Psi¹ Draconis Bb.

Nomenclature
ψ¹ Draconis (Latinised to Psi¹ Draconis) is the system's Bayer designation and 31 Draconis its Flamsteed designation. The designation of the components – ψ¹ Draconis A and B – derives from the convention used by the Washington Multiplicity Catalog (WMC) for multiple star systems, and adopted by the International Astronomical Union (IAU).

Psi¹ Draconis bore the traditional name of Dziban or Dsiban, derived from the Arabic Adh-Dhi'ban, meaning "The two wolves" or "The two jackals". In 2016, the IAU organized a Working Group on Star Names (WGSN) to catalog and standardize proper names for stars. The WGSN decided to attribute proper names to individual stars rather than entire multiple systems. It approved the name Dziban for the component Psi¹ Draconis A on 5 September 2017 and it is now so included in the List of IAU-approved Star Names.

In Chinese astronomy, Psi¹ Draconis is called 女史, Pinyin: Nǚshǐ, meaning Female Protocol, because this star is marking itself and stands alone in the asterism Female Protocol in the Purple Forbidden enclosure (see Chinese constellation). 女史 (Nǚshǐ) has been Latinised into Niu She by R.H. Allen, meaning "the Palace Governess", or "a Literary Woman".

Properties
ψ¹ Draconis AC and ψ¹ Draconis B are separated by about 31 arcseconds. Only a very small fraction of the orbit has been observed: an orbital period of 10,000 years has been calculated, but it is extremely preliminary and likely to be in high error.

ψ¹ Draconis A and C have varying radial velocities in respect to Earth, indicating that there must be orbital motion. The orbital period is estimated to be around 20 years, and the eccentricity must be fairly high, around 0.679.

Planetary system
Psi¹ Draconis Bb is a Jupiter-like exoplanet orbiting Psi¹ Draconis B, the secondary star. The planet was discovered when periodic Doppler shifts in the star's spectrum revealed the presence of a planet, similar to the spectroscopic binary nature of Psi¹ Draconis AC.

References

Draco (constellation)
Draconis, Psi1
Draconis, 31
Planetary systems with one confirmed planet
F-type main-sequence stars
F-type subgiants
086620
6637
162003
Durchmusterung objects
694.1
Spectroscopic binaries
Triple star systems